Surak (also Romanized as Sūrak) is a village in Aliabad Rural District, in the Central District of Taft County, Yazd Province, Iran. At the 2006 census, its population was 37, in 11 families.

References 

Populated places in Taft County